Pokémon Heroes: Latios and Latias is a 2002 Japanese animated fantasy film, the fifth in the Pokémon series, the first to use digital ink and paint, the last to receive a North American theatrical release until Pokémon the Movie: I Choose You!, and the last to feature the main cast from the first five seasons until the CGI remake of the first Pokémon movie. Directed by Kunihiko Yuyama and produced by OLM, Inc., the film stars the regular television cast of Rica Matsumoto, Yuji Ueda, Mayumi Iizuka, Megumi Hayashibara, Shin-ichiro Miki and Ikue Ōtani. The English adaptation was produced by 4Kids Entertainment and distributed by Miramax Films and was released in the United States on May 16, 2003. The English version stars the regular television cast of Veronica Taylor, Eric Stuart, Rachael Lillis and Maddie Blaustein. The events of the film take place during the fifth season of the Pokémon anime.

Pokémon Heroes focuses on the main characters, Ash, Misty and Brock, continuing their journey through the Johto region; the main location of the film is based on Venice, Italy. The name given to the city in the film is Alto Mare, meaning "high sea" in the Italian language. Although it is part of the group's adventure in Johto, the film takes place on an island off of the mainland.

Optimum Home Entertainment re-released the movie on DVD in the UK on May 9, 2011. StudioCanal released the film along with Pokémon 4Ever on Blu-ray in the UK as a double feature pack on April 2, 2012, just one day before Pokémon the Movie: Black—Victini and Reshiram and White—Victini and Zekrom came out on DVD on April 3, 2012. Echo Bridge Home Entertainment released the film on Blu-ray in the United States along with Pokémon: Destiny Deoxys on May 15, 2011.

Plot 
Their father, also a Latios, is said to have saved the city from an evil Pokémon Trainer and their Kabutops and Aerodactyl whilst transforming the city's streets into canals. The citizens built the Defense Mechanism of Alto Mare (D.M.A. for short) to protect the city if necessary, but have never had to use it.

In the present day, Team Rocket agents  and  acquire a book detailing the history of Alto Mare, plotting to control the D.M.A. Ash, Misty, and Brock are touring by and see an invisible Latias. Annie and Oakley stalk Latias, disguised as a human girl, trying to capture her using their Espeon and Ariados. Ash and Pikachu come to the rescue, guiding Latias to safety but she vanishes when Ash's back is turned.

Visiting the museum, the trio meet the curator  who details Alto Mare's history, the D.M.A., and the evil trainer's fossilized Pokémon on display. Ash spots a girl, who resembles Latias' disguise, and chases her across the city, but she does not recognize him. Latias herself appears, guiding Ash and Pikachu to a hidden garden where she and Latios live, protected by Lorenzo and Bianca, his granddaughter. While Pikachu plays with Latias and Latios, Lorenzo shows Ash the Soul Dew, unaware that Annie and Oakley's drone has infiltrated the sanctuary.

That night, Annie and Oakley sneak into the garden, successfully capturing Latios and the Soul Dew, but Latias escapes. Bianca and Lorenzo attempt to stop the thieves from using the D.M.A. but are captured, the Soul Dew and Latios are used to power the machine. Latias goes to Ash for help, with Latios' "Sight Sharing" ability allowing them to witness the events in the museum. Oakley becomes power hungry, using the D.M.A. to revive the Kabutops and Aerodactyl, and initiates a citywide lockdown to prevent interference. Ash, Pikachu, and Latias evade the lockdown, racing to the museum while being pursued by the Kabutops and Aerodactyl.

Oakley tries to drown the trio, but Latias' psychic powers cause the D.M.A. to go out of control. Reaching the museum, the trio rescue Latios and shut down the machine. However, Annie tries to take the blackened Soul Dew, which shatters, causing all of the city's water to flow out and return as a tidal wave. Latias and Latios combine their powers to stop the wave, with Latios giving his life in the process. The Kabutops and Aerodactyl are returned to their fossilized states, while Annie and Oakley remain trapped in the D.M.A..

Ash and friends find Latias, realizing Latios has died, but they share one last vision as he passes away. Several days later, Ash, Misty and Brock get ready to leave Alto Mare, saying goodbye to Lorenzo, but Bianca does not appear. On their way out of the city, they spot Bianca on the docks but she isn't wearing her hat (her hat is left back in her studio). Bianca gives Ash a sketch of him and Pikachu, kisses him on the cheek, and leaves without saying a word, Ash bids her goodbye and Brock and Misty are left wondering whether the girl was Bianca or Latias.

Annie and Oakley are soon saved by authorities and sent to prison, where they go through the possessions of Lawrence III.

Japanese version 
The Japanese version had a few key differences from the English version.
 Annie and Oakley were not affiliated with Team Rocket.
 The original Soul Dew may or may not have the soul of a Latios inside it at all. The one that appears after Latios' death still does.
 Latios' Japanese voice was not retained in the dub, which opted to use Latias's voice clips instead.
 The American version edited out the prologue where Annie and Oakley were reciting the legend of Alto Mare from the book they were about to steal. The prologue is as follows:

A long time ago, Alto Mare was just a small town. One day, an old couple walking along the beach found two unconscious children lying in the sand. They brought the children home and took care of them. But a dark cloud above Alto Mare rained down shards of darkness. Anything these shards touched became dark as well. One shard was about to hit the old couple when the children started to glow and all the shards were destroyed. The  children revealed themselves as Latios and Latias. More appeared, one of them carrying the Soul Dew. Their power, combined with the Soul Dew's, shone upon the dark cloud, vanquishing it. In gratitude for their help, the two Latios and Latias gave the Soul Dew to the old couple.

Cast

Reception 
Pokémon Heroes received negative reviews from critics, earning a Rotten Tomatoes rating of 17%. Lou Lumenick of the New York Post did not give the film any stars, wrote a short review for it, and called it an animated form of child abuse and recommend parents to rent Spirited Away for their children. Desson Thomson said "This one's for kids and no one else".

Box office and release 
The first three Pokémon films, Pokémon: The First Movie, Pokémon: The Movie 2000, and Pokémon 3: The Movie, were released outside of Japan by Warner Bros., but the distribution rights for Pokémon 4Ever and Pokémon Heroes were given to Miramax on April 2, 2002, by The Pokémon Company. Miramax was rumored to have bought the rights for $1 million and by giving up 75% of the profits. Harvey Weinstein stated that Miramax could "reinvigorate the franchise".

The film opened at the same time as Star Wars: Episode II – Attack of the Clones in Japan (where it had opened at number one), and failed to out-gross it. It later fell to ninth place at the Japanese box office behind Star Wars: Episode II – Attack of the Clones and Stuart Little 2. The film grossed  in Japan.

In North America, the film had a limited run in theaters, only opening with 196. The film completed its American run on July 10, 2003, grossing $746,381. As of 2019, it is the lowest grossing theatrically released Pokémon movie in the United States, and future animated Pokémon feature film releases in North America have been direct-to-DVD releases.

See also 
 List of films based on video games

Notes

References

External links 

 
 
 
 
 

2002 anime films
2000s Japanese-language films
Films set in Venice
Heroes
Toho animated films
Films directed by Kunihiko Yuyama
Japanese animated fantasy films
Japanese fantasy adventure films
Japanese sequel films
Films scored by Shinji Miyazaki
OLM, Inc. animated films